Fazl Rural District is a rural district (dehestan) in Zarrin Dasht District, Nahavand County, Hamadan Province, Iran. At the 2006 census, its population was 4,268, in 1,068 families. The rural district has 8 villages.

References 

Rural Districts of Hamadan Province
Nahavand County